Mount Powell  may refer to one of the following:

One of several mountain peaks in the United States:
Mount Powell (California)
Mount Powell (Colorado) - highest summit of the Gore Range
Mount Powell (Granite County, Montana) - highest summit of the Flint Creek Range
Mount Powell (Powell County, Montana) in Powell County, Montana
Mount Powell (New Mexico)
Mount Powell (Utah)
A mountain in Antarctica:
Mount Powell (Antarctica)

See also

 
Powell Mountain, a mountain ridge of the Appalachian Mountains, North America
Powell Mountain (Mineral County, Nevada), a summit in the U.S. state of Nevada

Mount Baden-Powell, San Gabriel Mountains, California, USA; a mountain
Powell Butte (disambiguation)
Powell (disambiguation)